The population of Sabah stands at 3,418,785 according to the 2020 Malaysian census. This makes Sabah the third most populous state in Malaysia. It also has the highest non-citizen population at 810,443. Although Malaysia is one of the least densely populated countries in Asia, Sabah is particularly sparsely populated. Most of the population is concentrated along coastal areas, with towns and urban centers seeing the most population growth. The population of Sabah in 1970 was 653,604, with both the state and its neighbor Sarawak, having about the same number of foreign nationals. In 1980, the state saw a sharp rise in its population with the arrival of almost a million refugees fleeing the Moro conflict in neighbouring southern Philippines. Around the same time, large numbers of legal workers from both Indonesia and the Philippines also arrived in Sabah, drawn by the economic boom in its primary sector. In 1992, Sabah's population increased to over 1,734,685,  then to 2,468,246 in 2000. By 2010, this grew to 3,117,405. Sabah has 900,000 registered migrant workers in agriculture, plantations, construction, services, and domestic work. The total number of illegal immigrants and refugees  Most of these illegal immigrants are believed to have been categorized as "other bumiputera" in the national statistics. Sabah has also seen an increase in the number of expatriates, mostly from China, Taiwan, South Korea, Japan, Australia, and Europe. In the near term, the population is expected to grow from increasing interracial marriages and migration.

People from Sabah are called Sabahans and generally identify themselves as such. Sabah is home to an estimated 42 ethic groups, and over 200 distinct sub-ethnic groups each with their own language, culture, and spiritual beliefs. The coastal and low land areas are inhabited mostly by the Bajau, Bruneian Malay, Bugis, Cocos Malays, Illanun, Kedayan and Suluk. These groups traditionally worked as fishermen and farmers. The highland areas in the interior are inhabited mostly by the Kadazan-Dusun, Murut, and Lun Bawang (or Lun Dayeh) and their sub-groups. These groups traditionally worked as farmers and hunters. The term Bumiputera (son of the soil) is used in Malaysia to refer to those of Malay and indigenous descent. This demographic generally enjoys special privileges in education, employment, finance, and politics. Within the Bumiputera demographic, the term Orang Asal refers to just those of indigenous descent, excluding the Malays.

The three largest indigenous groups in Sabah are the Kadazan-Dusun, Bajau, and Murut. These are followed by the Bruneian Malays, Suluk, and others. Citizens of Chinese descent make up the majority of the non-Bumiputera population.

Ethnic groups

Kadazan-Dusun 

The Kadazan-Dusun is the largest indigenous group in Sabah, comprising the blending of the Kadazan and Dusun peoples and their 40 sub-groups. Each sub-group has a different, though largely mutually intelligible, language and tradition. Although the term Kadazan-Dusun is primarily used to collectively refer to the two groups as a whole, it also sometimes include other groups like the Murut, Orang Sungai, Rungus, Tidong and Lun Bawang/Lun Dayeh peoples. These other ethnic groups also identify as "Other Bumiputera". Today, the Kadazan reside mainly in urban areas, whereas the Dusun prefer the hills and upland valleys. The Kadazan are mostly settled in the areas around Penampang, Papar, Ranau, Tambunan and Keningau, whereas the Dusun are mostly concentrated in the areas of Tuaran, Ranau, and Tambunan. The Kadazan-Dusun were once known for their headhunting practices as well for their skills as farmers, hunters, and river fisherfolk.

The Kadazan once lived in longhouses, while the Dusun lived in single traditional houses (although some also lived in longhouses). As both peoples are traditionally rice farmers, they celebrate an annual harvest festival known as the Kaamatan. The Kadazan-Dusun community has a belief that their ancestors come from the Nunuk Ragang (a red banyan tree). Located not far from the tree are the two rivers Liwagu and Gelibang, which became the route through which their community spread to all over the interior of Sabah.

Bajau 

The second largest indigenous group of Sabah is the Bajau. The Bajaus in Sabah are generally divided into two main groups: the West Coast and East Coast. The West Coast Bajau generally lived in land and were known for their traditional horse culture. They mostly settled the area from Kota Belud, Kota Kinabalu, Tuaran and Papar. Meanwhile, the East Coast Bajau mostly spend their lives in the sea and settled around the area of Semporna, Lahad Datu and Kunak; they also hold their annual regatta lepa festival.

Once known as seafarers, the West Coast Bajau started to learn farming and cattle rearing since their migration from the Philippine archipelago a long time ago. Their skills in horsemanship are well known locally, and they engage in horsemanship activities on their festive occasions, during which riders will be dressed in colorful traditional costumes. The East Coast Bajau on the other hand still live as they traditionally have, with fishing having become their main source of income. Most of them lived in stilt water villages and some spending most of their lives in their boat. The East Coast Bajau are also known as good divers and can spend more than five minutes in the waters without using an oxygen tank.

Murut 

The Muruts are the third largest indigenous group of Sabah, settling the areas around Keningau, Tenom, Nabawan, Pensiangan and along the river areas of Sapulut, Padas and Kinabatangan. Like the Kadazan-Dusun, they were also once known for their headhunting practice, and now as farmers and hunters. The Muruts once lived in longhouses, but today they have adopted modern dwellings, although the Muruts in the north of Sabah still live in longhouses. The Muruts have a great knowledge of botanical healers, with each of their community having their own herbalist that can cure such illness ranging from diarrhea, diabetes and high blood pressure. Since the abolishment of headhunting by the British, many of the Muruts have served as police and soldiers for the British. This has been maintained until today, with many of the Muruts having served in the Malaysian Armed Forces. The Muruts also celebrate a harvest festival like the Kadazan-Dusun, although their festival is called Kalimaran.

Melayu Brunei and Kedayan

The traditional Malays in Sabah are the Bruneian Malays, who mostly inhabit the area in the south-west coast. They mostly settled in Beaufort, Sipitang, Kuala Penyu and Papar. Their migration to northern Borneo is noticeable during the rule of the Sultanate of Brunei. The Cocos Malays and Kedayan are also included in this group, together with the recent Malays who migrated from Peninsular Malaysia, as Malays are defined by the Malaysian Constitution as those who are Muslim, and speak and conform to Malay customs. However, although the Bruneian are Malays, their culture and language slightly differ from the majority of Malays in the peninsula.

Tausug / Suluk

The Suluks settled around the east coast of Sabah, mainly in Sandakan, Semporna and Lahad Datu. They started to settle in the areas since their migration from the Sulu Archipelago during the rule of the Sultanate of Sulu, together with the Bajaus and Illanuns. Many of them at the time are believed to have fled the slave trade in the Sulu Archipelago, Spanish oppression, as well as some are actually descendants of a Sulu princess (Dayang-Dayang) who fled from the sultan of Sulu who tried to make the princess as his wife. The indigenous Suluks are different from the recently arrived Tausug immigrants from the Philippines as they have embraced the multiculturalism in northern Borneo. Due to the purported racism and discrimination faced by indigenous Suluks, triggered mostly by the illegal immigration as well as militants from Sulu who are mostly Tausugs from the Philippines, indigenous Suluks prefer to be distinguished and differentiated from the Tausugs in the Philippines.

Chinese 

Forming the largest non-indigenous group in Sabah is the Chinese, many of whom arrived before the arrival of the British to northern Borneo, as shown in both Brunei and Sulu sultanates records, as well from British records. The earliest documentation of Chinese settlement in Sabah dates back to the 7th century, on the Kinabatangan River banks. However, the links between northern Borneo and China could be much longer since during the Han dynasty. The migration of the Chinese to northern Borneo saw a significant increase following the establishment of the North Borneo Chartered Company in 1881. At the time, the British considered the native populations as being too small in number to boost the North Borneo economy. Until this day, the Chinese are very important to the state economy, engaging in business-related activities. The Chinese in Sabah can be divided into three main groups of Hakka, Cantonese and Hokkien people. The Hakka form the majority of Chinese in Sabah, followed by the Cantonese and Hokkien. There is also a community of northern Chinese in the state, with most of them identified themselves as Tianjin ren (people from Tianjin). All the Chinese community are united under the Sabah United Chinese Chambers of Commerce (SUCC), an organisation that promotes national unity and continuous contribution towards the state economy.

Other Bumiputeras

Sabah also has other minority indigenous/native ethnic groups, other than the four largest indigenous groups of Kadazandusun, Bajau, Melayu Brunei and Murut. This includes Rungus, Orang Sungei, Iranun, Bonggi, Kwijau, Paitan, Lun Bawang, Lundayeh, Kedayan, Iban, Binadan, Bisaya, Kokos, Rumanau, Lotud, Minokok, Tidung, Kagayan, Tatana, Tagaas, Ubian, Kimaragang, Bajau Laut, Ida'an, Inokang and Sonsogon.

The ethnic identification is nevertheless fluid as some might identify as belonging to one of the major ethnic groups in Sabah (example is Rungus and Orang Sungei being sub-ethnics of Kadazandusun, while Kedayan and Kokos being sub-ethnics of Malay), while others insist on a separate ethnic group not belonging to any of the major indigenous groups.

The categorization under the term "Other Bumiputeras" for official usage has brought some controversy as there were speculation that this term was misused to include the counting of Filipino and Indonesian immigrants that was naturalized either through some connivance elements in the state bureaucracy or through fraudulent documents.

Distribution by ethnicities 
The following table shows Sabah total population by ethnic group based on the last four census:

Meanwhile, below maps are distribution of ethnic groups in Sabah by state constituencies, based on 2020 census.

Religion 

Prior to the arrival of Islam and Christianity, the indigenous peoples of North Borneo mainly practiced Animism and Paganism. Islam arrived in the 10th century on the west coast of Borneo, following the conversion of the first ruler of Brunei into Islam. In addition, Islamic teachings spread from Sulu and Sulawesi into the coastal areas of eastern Borneo. The first Christian missionary in northern Borneo was a Spanish mariner and priest, Rev. Msgr. Carlos Cuarteroni; although at the time the British had already established their presence in the island of Labuan. Meanwhile, Buddhism, Taoism and other Chinese folk religions as well the Indian religions of Hinduism and Sikhism arrived as a result of the migration of the Chinese and Indians into northern Borneo.

Since the amendments of the 1973 Sabah constitution by Chief Minister Mustapha Harun, Islam has been declared as the state religion of Sabah. However, the amendments are considered controversial, as they are against the 20-point agreement that was agreed upon prior to the formation of Malaysia that stated that there would be no state religion for North Borneo. It is believed that the amendments were made while ignoring the indigenous peoples. In 1960, the population of Muslims in Sabah was only 37.9%, Animists at 33.3%, while Christians were at 16.6% and those of another religion 12.2%. However, following Mustapha Harun coming into power, the Muslim population suddenly began to increase rapidly. By 2010, the percentage of Muslims had increased to 65.4%, while Christians grew to 26.6% and Buddhists 6.1%.

The Population and Housing Censuses figures shows approximately these proportions of the population following these religions: Significant increment in the Muslim population between 1980 and 2010 of almost half a million people for every 10 years highlights the height of Project IC, an alleged demographic engineering in Sabah.

Mass conversion and autonomy in freedom of religion issues 

Since the colonial period, various Christian groups from the West had actively engaged in the evangelisation of the indigenous people of North Borneo as part of an effort to improve the standard of living of the natives and eradicate tribal wars, headhunting, and excessive alcohol consumption. However, post independence and especially during the helm of Sabah's third chief minister, Mustapha Harun, the Christian groups were involved in a dispute with Mustapha over the alleged discrimination, biased and unfair treatment towards them. Under Mustapha's political party, USNO, large-scale Islamisation was carried out by the United Sabah Islamic Association (USIA). The organization at the time expelled a number of Christian missionary workers, converted elite politicians and carried out mass conversion on animist villagers as well as some older Chinese generations in exchange for their citizenship, office positions and/or cash rewards. This was followed by the influx of Filipino refugees from Mindanao and Indonesian immigrants from Sulawesi who are majority Muslim that were harbored to increase the Muslim populations. These immigrants were eventually integrated into the community and naturalized as Sabahan and Malaysian via an alleged program called Project IC. After the fall of USNO, BERJAYA adopted the "multi-racial principles" which has won the vote from non-Muslims. However, the party began to adopt Islamic vision with the establishment of Majlis Ugama Islam Sabah (MUIS). The conversion of indigenous villagers became rampant at the time. This also led to the fall of BERJAYA when the support from non-Muslim began to dwindle as there were interference on the indigenous faith and rituals. When Sabah administration was taken over by a non-Muslim party, PBS, many false warnings regarding the threat to Islam were spread amongst the people in order to disrupt the harmony and re-establish the position of the Muslim dominated parties. Peninsular Malaysia politicians were brought in to strategize the downfall of PBS by any means (including Project IC) in the pretense of protecting Islam.

Moreover, since the amendments of the controversial 1973 constitution, Sabah has been facing more mass religious conversion cases. There are highly controversial issues such as when indigenous natives who have either been a Christian or pagan, were instead identified as a Muslim when they received their identity cards during application. This was partly due to confusion that arose as a result of federal authorities in Peninsular Malaysia assuming that the usage of "bin" and "binti" in the birth certificates of these indigenous non-Muslim Sabahans as an indication that they are professing the Muslim faith. The confusion hence originated from reckless officers who manipulated the ignorance of indigenous natives when registering the birth of their newborn babies, by adding bin/binti into the names of these babies. In addition to that, there are frequent reports of villagers who were tricked into conversion by certain non-governmental organizations from the Peninsular Malaysia, as well the conversion of students in schools by teachers from the Peninsular without their parents' knowledge and consent.

While any non-Muslims in the state who want to convert to Islam can be easily accepted by the state law, any Muslims who wish to leave their religion will be detained in the state Islamic Rehabilitation Centre until they repent or jailed for up to 36 months (3 years). A bid for the establishment of Sabah first Christian radio also went unheeded by the federal government communication ministry until it was brought up to court. In addition, the religious zealotry and intolerance from certain Muslims hardcore groups in the Peninsular have started to affect the cultural and religious diversity in the state of Sabah. The federal government however have denied any links with all the controversial conversions that was done by certain quarters and said that it is not the policy of the government to force someone to change their religion. Prior to this, there has been frequent calls to the government to restore the freedom of religion in the state and to respect each other's religion to prevent religious tensions which will affect the peace and harmony in the state.

Languages 

The indigenous languages of Sabah can be divided into four language families, i.e. Dusunic, Murutic, Paitanic and Sama–Bajau. Studies suggest that the only truly Bornean languages spoken in Sabah are those belonging to the Dusunic, Murutic and Paitanic language families  while the Sama–Bajau languages originate from the southern Philippines. The Dusunic is the largest of the four families. It comprises the Kadazan Dusun language, which has dialects spread throughout the districts of Papar, Penampang, Kota Kinabalu, Tuaran, Ranau, Tambunan and Keningau. It is followed by the Murutic languages of southern Sabah, which are spoken mainly in Keningau, Tenom, Nabawan and Pensiangan. The Paitanic languages are spoken in the areas along the east coast rivers of Paitan, Kinabatangan and Segama. The Sama–Bajau are concentrated along parts of the West and East Coasts. Malay language is taught as the main language for conversation across different ethnicities in the state, although Sabahan creole is different from Sarawak Malay and Peninsular Malay. Sabah has its own slang for Malay which originated either from indigenous words, Brunei Malay, Suluk, Cocos Malay and Indonesian language.

The large Chinese minority in Sabah are mostly of the Hakka subgroup. As such, the Hakka dialect is the most commonly spoken Chinese dialect in the state. There are also significant minorities speaking other dialects, particular the Cantonese and Hokkien dialects. Additionally, as Chinese schools in Malaysia use Mandarin as the language of instruction, many Chinese Sabahans are also proficient in Mandarin, albeit a "Malaysianised" form of it. While a Spanish-based creole, Zamboangueño, a dialect of Chavacano, has spread into one village of Sabah in Semporna prior to the migration of people from the southern Philippines.

In 1971, the state government of Sabah under Mustapha Harun submitted an enactment recognizing Malaysian language as the state's official language. Following the amendments of 1973 Constitution, the use of English language has been restricted to only for official purposes with the extension of the 1967 Malaysian National Language Act. As a result of the domination of Malaysian language into the state, the proficiency over English language among younger Sabahan generations have been gradually decreasing. The largest indigenous language of Kadazan Dusun has also become an endangered language as the language have not been made a compulsory language in the state schools. Due to the tight Malay culture and language policies over national schools, many Sabahan bumiputera parents have preferred to send their children to Chinese schools of which based on a survey in 2010 revealed there is around 12,138 Sabahan bumiputera students enrolled in Chinese national type primary schools and preschools, becoming the second state after Sarawak with the highest number of bumiputera pupils enrolment in Chinese schools. In addition with the perception among non-Chinese parents that Chinese schools provide a better quality education and were more disciplined along with the rise of China as a new global economic powers that forced the need to mastered Chinese languages. Since 2014, the British Council have actively giving assistance to teach English in primary schools followed by Fulbright Program from the United States in 2015 to teaching English in secondary schools. Kadazan Dusun language also started to be promoted at the same time, with the language teacher will complete their training in 2018 and start to teach in 2019. Starting from 2016, the Sabah Education Department has set Tuesday as an English Day for schools to return the English proficiency in the state and all younger generations have been urged to converse more in English.

Following the change of the government after the 2018 general election, the new Sabah government has stated that there is no restriction on the usage of English in the state, adding that even if the Education Ministry stated that it is unlawful for English be used in Sabah, they will not allow it to be imposed in the state with the state government will undo the improper law since the restrictions will only making damage to their younger generations especially when they need to work in private firms or organisations that require English proficiency. The new state government also stated that they will look into the matters if there is a need for a change in the state law.

Immigration to Sabah 

The movement of people between Sabah, Sarawak, Brunei, the southern Philippines and the Indonesian province of Kalimantan have existed for centuries and were not restricted at the time. Prior to the modern laws and the lawlessness issues created by the recent immigrants, there has been emphasis to control and monitor such illegal movements. The first large-scale human migration to the modern state of Sabah occurred in the 1970s, when hundred thousands of Filipino refugees, mostly the Moros, began arriving in the state due to political uncertainty in the southern Philippines of Mindanao. Unlike the case of Vietnamese refugees in the Peninsular Malaysia, where most of the Vietnamese were successfully repatriated to maintain the racial balance for the Malays there, the Filipino refugees in Sabah are welcomed by certain politicians in the state mostly by USNO, BERJAYA's as well the dominant federal government political party of UMNO to increase the racial balance in favour to the Malays with the state autonomy in immigration being manipulated for political gains. Some Vietnamese boat people refugees also reaching Sabah shores as part of the Indochina refugee crisis although most of them today have been sent to Western countries as Malaysian leader at the time Mahathir Mohamad only wants Muslim refugees who should stay in the country. Since 2000, around 20,000 Muslim foreigners from the Philippines and Indonesia have married to local Sabahans, in addition to a number of foreign men from Afghanistan, Algeria and Bangladesh marrying local Sabahan women based on a figures released by the Sabah Islamic Religious Affairs Department (JHEAINS).

Sabah has a significant Chinese minority. Chinese immigrants first came to Sabah from southern China in the late 19th century fleeing famine and overpopulation in their homeland. They were enticed to Sabah by the promises of British colonists, who invited them to help clear the forests and farm the land in return for various benefits. While early Chinese immigrants were mostly involved in agriculture, most eventually became involved in business, operating sundry shops, coffee shops and so on. To this day, Chinese Sabahans play a pivotal role in the state's commercial scene. Most Chinese Sabahans are of Hakka descent, but there are significant numbers of Chinese Sabahans from other dialect groups, especially the Cantonese and Hokkien subgroups. The largest Chinese populations in Sabah are in the three major cities of Kota Kinabalu, Sandakan and Tawau. Smaller rural communities exist, particularly in the districts of Kudat, Keningau, Tenom and Beaufort.

Unlike in Peninsular Malaysia, the South Asian population in Sabah is small. It consists mainly of Indians and Pakistanis, some of whom are descended from immigrants who served in the British colonial military. Sabah is also home to a large number of foreign immigrants from Indonesia and the Philippines. The Indonesian community is composed mostly of Buginese, Florenese, Torajans and Timorese people who have come to Sabah to work as labourers, in oil palm plantations or as domestic workers. The Filipino community can broadly be divided into two: descendants of mostly Christian immigrants who worked as professionals during the colonial era, and the mostly-Muslim immigrants from the southern Philippines who came during the USNO era. In recent years, the number of expatriates in the state has increased. They come mostly from China, Taiwan, South Korea, Japan, Australia and various countries in Europe, particularly the United Kingdom.

Demographic issues 

There are many reports stating that following the influx of refugees and foreigners from the Muslim areas of Mindanao in the Philippines as well from Sulawesi in Indonesia, a "secretive taskforce" was established in the 1970s during Mustapha Harun's term as Chief Minister to register them as citizens. The taskforce then actively engaged from 1988 to 1990 by registering not only the Muslim refugees and migrants but also to Muslims from Peninsular Malaysia to topple the state government under PBS who were majority Christian. A source from one of the former Sabah Chief Ministers estimated the total of illegal immigrants in the state to be around 400,000–500,000 while Sabah's opposition parties together with the Filipino community leaders indicated that the numbers have surpassed one million. The complicated estimate was as a result of frequent "controversial regularisation" with the illegal immigrants and refugees changing their status into "legal citizen". Most of those who have been deported also can return to the state within weeks or a few months. Most of the immigration issues have been perceived by the locals as politically motivated to systematically change the demography of the state; citing a case of a local woman who had been denied citizenship until present. Although the local woman had been living in the state and born to a Sabahan indigenous family, she was still being denied citizenship by the state government, while recently arrived immigrants had acquire their Malaysian identity card in just a short time though the immigrants did not have any relationship with Malaysian citizens:

Another indigenous woman faced difficulties in sending her child to school when the child was listed as a Muslim without the mother's consent in his recently received birth certificate from the National Registration Department (NRD) which the mother refused to accept the document as the child was born as Christian; with such cases having occurred several times and causing the department to be labelled as practicing religiously-motivated "cleansing" of the state to systematically Islamize its people. This was also added to the exposure of corruption within the Malaysian authorities by an Indonesian investigative television program in the late 2016, where thousands of Indonesian migrants managed to cross easily through the border in Tawau Division every day, with many of the illegal immigrants also receiving the "Bantuan Rakyat 1Malaysia" (a type of Malaysian government aid to local low-income Malaysians in the form of money) through the fake identity cards they were using when arriving in the Malaysian territory. Following the seriousness of the issues that have created some ethnic tension among Sabahans as well affecting the security and stability of the state, the federal government agreed to set up a royal commission to investigate the problems. Among the proposals by Sabahan parties during the commission is to re-call all identity cards (ICs) issued in the state and issue new ICs only for eligible Sabahan citizens which will also to ensure the integrity of the Malaysian identity card system. The federal government also been urged to speed up the process of registering all of its indigenous natives who are still stateless despite being indigenous people who supposedly deserve a special position in their own homeland. Following the coverage of the issue, the Chief Minister has instructed NRD to rectify the matters immediately.

See also 
 Demographics of Sarawak
 Demographics of Malaysia

Notes

References 

Sabah
Sabah